GMM Bravo (also stylized as GMM BRAVO!) is a Thai television content and production subsidiary of GMM Grammy. It serves as a content creation operating unit that produces television drama series through the use of the media conglomerate's music resources for its digital television channel GMM 25.

History 
Established on 1 June 2016, GMM Bravo was a product of GMM 25's revamp on its programming as it aimed to increase its revenue to ฿800 million. With its creation, Fahmai Damrongchaitham was tasked to lead the subsidiary and oversee GMM Bravo's effort in producing television drama series that would appeal to audiences in the 15–34 age range.

Its pioneer project was Bangkok Love Stories, a television drama series based on GMM Grammy's popular songs such as 's "Khon Mee Saneh" (คนมีเสน่ห์), 's "Phae Thang" (แพ้ทาง), 's "Kep Rak" (เก็บรัก) and 's "Please".

In 2018, GMM Bravo organized "BRAVO! BOYS", a search for young male talents across Thailand and its neighboring countries such as Myanmar, Vietnam, Laos and Cambodia as it expanded its content on digital platforms. Among it winners were Ekkaphon Deeboonmee Na Chumphae (Au), Nuttapong Boonyuen (Max), Thanadol Auepong (Parm), Chindanai Dechawaleekul (Hearth), Vayu Kessuvit (Few), Martin Sidel, Thanawin Teeraphosukarn (Louis) and Pawin Kulkarunyawich (Win). They were also joined by Everest Moe (Eve) from Myanmar, Jah Deth Teng Hortnarong from Cambodia and Trung Hieu Le from Vietnam.

GMM Bravo is notable for The Stranded (เคว้ง), a television series that the company has produced together with H2L Media Group in association with Netflix Studios. It was among the first two Netflix original Thai series together with Shimmers (อุบัติกาฬ).

List of GMM Bravo productions

References

External links 

GMM Grammy
Television production companies of Thailand
Mass media companies established in 2016
2016 establishments in Thailand